Arthur Joseph Griffith (31 March 1871 – 12 August 1922) was an Irish writer, newspaper editor and politician who founded the political party Sinn Féin. He led the Irish delegation at the negotiations that produced the 1921 Anglo-Irish Treaty, and served as the president of Dáil Éireann from January 1922 until his death later in August.

After a short spell in South Africa, Griffith founded and edited the Irish nationalist newspaper The United Irishman in 1899. On 28 November 1905, he presented "The Sinn Féin Policy" at the first annual convention of his organisation, the National Council; the occasion is marked as the founding date of the Sinn Féin party. Griffith took over as president of Sinn Féin in 1911, but at that time the organisation was still small.

Griffith was arrested following the Easter Rising of 1916, despite not having taken any part in it. On his release, he worked to build up Sinn Féin, which won a string of by-election victories. At the party's  (annual convention) in October 1917, Sinn Féin became an unambiguously republican party, and Griffith resigned the presidency in favour of the 1916 leader Éamon de Valera, becoming vice-president instead. Griffith was elected as an MP for East Cavan in a by-election in June 1918, and re-elected in the 1918 general election, when Sinn Féin won a huge electoral victory over the Irish Parliamentary Party and, refusing to take their seats at Westminster, set up their own constituent assembly, Dáil Éireann.

In the Dáil, Griffith served as Minister for Home Affairs from 1919 to 1921, and Minister for Foreign Affairs from 1921 to 1922. In September 1921, he was appointed chairman of the Irish delegation to negotiate a treaty with the British government. After months of negotiations, he and the other four delegates signed the Anglo-Irish Treaty, which created the Irish Free State, but not as a republic. This led to a split in the Dáil. After the Treaty was narrowly approved by the Dáil, de Valera resigned as president and Griffith was elected in his place. The split led to the Irish Civil War. Griffith died suddenly in August 1922, two months after the outbreak of that war.

Family and early life
Arthur Joseph Griffith was born at 61 Upper Dominick Street, Dublin on 31 March 1871, of distant Welsh lineage. His great-great-grandfather, William Griffith of Drws-y-coed Uchaf, Rhyd-ddu, Caernarvonshire (1719-1782), was a farmer and supporter of the Moravian Church cause. His great grandfather, Griffith Griffith (b. 1789), emigrated first to the United States and then to Ireland, where some of his sisters had settled in Dublin among the Moravian community there. A Roman Catholic, Griffith was educated by the Irish Christian Brothers. He worked for a time as a printer before joining the Gaelic League, which was aimed at promoting the restoration of the Irish language.

His father had been a printer on The Nation newspaper — Griffith was one of several employees locked out in the early 1890s due to a dispute with a new owner of the paper. The young Griffith was a member of the Irish Republican Brotherhood (IRB). He initially supported Parnell's political views, but then decided that Parnell's political outlook was not what he thought was best for Ireland. Griffith visited South Africa from 1896 to 1898. In South Africa, Griffith supported the Boers in their campaign against British expansionism and was a supporter of Paul Kruger.

In 1899, on returning to Dublin, Griffith co-founded the weekly United Irishman newspaper with his associate William Rooney, who died in 1901. On 24 November 1910, Griffith married his fiancée, Maud Sheehan, after a six-year engagement; they had a son and a daughter.

Griffith's fierce criticism of the Irish Parliamentary Party's alliance with the British Liberal Party was heavily influenced by the anti-Liberal rhetoric of Young Irelander John Mitchel. Griffith supported the Limerick boycott, advocating shunning Jewish-owned businesses in the city. Griffith also supported movements seeking national independence from the British Empire in Egypt and India, and wrote a highly-critical description of the British government action at Matabele. Despite his opposition to communism and socialism, he sometimes worked with James Connolly, who also supported Irish nationalism.

In September 1900, he established an organisation called Cumann na nGaedheal ("Society of the Gaels"), to unite advanced nationalist and separatist groups and clubs. In 1903, he set up the National Council, to campaign against the visit to Ireland of King Edward VII and his consort Alexandra of Denmark. In 1907, that organisation merged with the Sinn Féin League, which itself had been formed from an amalgamation of Cumann na nGaedheal and the Dungannon Clubs, to form what would become Sinn Féin.

In 1906, after the United Irishman journal collapsed because of a libel suit, Griffith re-founded it under the title Sinn Féin. It briefly became a daily in 1909 and survived until its suppression by the British government in 1914, after which Griffith became editor of the new nationalist journal, Nationality.

Foundation of Sinn Féin
Most historians opt for 28 November 1905 as a founding date because it was on this date that Griffith first presented his 'Sinn Féin Policy'. In his writings, Griffith declared that the Act of Union of Great Britain and Ireland in 1800 was illegal and that, consequently, the Anglo-Irish dual monarchy that existed under Grattan's Parliament and the so-called Constitution of 1782 were still in effect. Its first president was Edward Martyn.

The fundamental principles of abstentionism on which Sinn Féin was founded were outlined in an article published in 1904, by Griffith called The Resurrection of Hungary, in which, noting how in 1867 Hungary went from being part of the Austrian Empire to a separate co-equal kingdom in Austria-Hungary. Though not a monarchist himself, Griffith advocated such an approach for the Anglo-Irish relationship, namely that Ireland should become a separate kingdom alongside Great Britain, the two forming a dual monarchy with a shared monarch but separate governments, as it was thought this solution would be more palatable to the British. This was similar to the policy of Henry Grattan a century earlier. However, this idea was never really embraced by later separatist leaders, especially Michael Collins, and never came to anything, although Kevin O'Higgins toyed with the idea as a means of ending partition, shortly before his assassination in 1927.

Griffith sought to combine elements of Parnellism with the traditional separatist approach; he saw himself not as a leader but as providing a strategy which a new leader might follow. Central to his strategy was parliamentary abstention: the belief that Irish MPs should refuse to attend the Parliament of the United Kingdom at Westminster, but should instead establish a separate Irish parliament (with an administrative system based on local government) in Dublin.

Griffith was a staunch economic nationalist, he argued that nationalism was central to the fostering of economic growth. He often cited the works of German economist Friedrich List.

In February 1908, Sinn Féin unsuccessfully contested a by-election in North Leitrim, where the sitting MP, one Charles Dolan of Manorhamilton, County Leitrim, had defected to Sinn Féin. At this time Sinn Féin was being infiltrated by the Irish Republican Brotherhood, who saw it as a vehicle for their aims; it had several local Councillors (mostly in Dublin, including W. T. Cosgrave) and contained a dissident wing grouped from 1910 around the monthly periodical called Irish Freedom. The IRB members argued that the aim of dual monarchism should be replaced by republicanism and that Griffith was excessively inclined to compromise with conservative elements (notably in his pro-employer position during the 1913–1914 Dublin Lockout, when he saw the syndicalism of James Larkin as aimed at crippling Irish industry for Great Britain's benefit).

In 1911, he helped to found the Proportional Representation Society of Ireland, believing that proportional representation would help to prevent animosity between unionists and nationalists in an independent Ireland.

1916 Rising
In 1916, rebels seized and took over a number of key locations in Dublin, in what became known as the Easter Rising. After its defeat, it was widely described both by British politicians and the Irish and British media as the "Sinn Féin rebellion", even though Sinn Féin had very limited involvement. When in 1917, surviving leaders of the rebellion were released from gaol (or escaped) they joined Sinn Féin en masse, using it as a vehicle for the advancement of the republic. The result was a bitter clash between those original members who backed Griffith's concept of an Anglo-Irish dual monarchy and the new members, under Éamon de Valera, who wanted to achieve a republic. Matters almost led to a split at the party's Ard Fheis (conference) in October 1917.

In a compromise, it was decided to seek to establish a republic initially, then allow the people to decide whether they wanted a republic or a monarchy, subject to the condition that no member of Britain's royal house could sit on any prospective Irish throne. At that Ard Fheis, Griffith resigned the presidency of Sinn Féin in favour of de Valera; he and Fr. Michael O'Flanagan were elected Vice-Presidents. The leaders of the Irish Parliamentary Party (IPP) sought a rapprochement with Griffith over the British threat of conscription, which both parties condemned, but Griffith refused unless the IPP embraced his more radical and subversive ideals, a suggestion which John Dillon, a leader of the IPP rubbished as unrealistic, although it would ultimately mean the defeat and dissolution of the IPP after the election in December 1918.

War of Independence

In May 1918, along with Éamon de Valera and 72 other Sinn Féiners, Griffith was arrested on the pretext of involvement in the fictitious German Plot. Griffith spent ten months interned in HM Prison Gloucester, being released on 6 March 1919. Fr. O'Flanagan was left as Acting-President of Sinn Féin.  Griffith was put forward as a Sinn Féin candidate for the East Cavan by-election on 20 June 1918. Under the slogan "Put him in to get him out," and was elected. and held the seat when Sinn Féin subsequently routed the Irish Parliamentary Party at the 1918 general election with a commitment of abstentionism from the British House of Commons. Griffith was returned for both East Cavan and Tyrone North West.

Sinn Féin's MPs set up an Irish parliament, Dáil Éireann and declared independence for the Irish Republic; the Irish War of Independence followed almost immediately. The dominant leaders in the Dáil included Éamon de Valera, President of Dáil Éireann (1919–21), President of the Republic (1921–1922), and Michael Collins, Minister for Finance, head of the IRB and the Irish Republican Army's Director of Intelligence.

During de Valera's absence in the United States (1919–21) Griffith served as Acting President and gave regular press interviews. He was arrested at his house at 3am, on 26 November 1920, and later jailed, Fr. O'Flanagan again taking over as acting leader until de Valera returned from America on 23 December. Griffith was to spend the next seven months in Dublin's Mountjoy Prison. He was released on 30 June 1921 as peace moves got under way.

In Ireland, a general election was held on 24 May 1921 and Griffith, while still in prison, headed the poll in the contested constituency of Fermanagh and Tyrone, and was returned unopposed for Cavan. On 26 August 1921, Griffith was appointed Minister for Foreign Affairs in the new Irish cabinet.

Treaty negotiations and death

In September 1921, de Valera, President of the Republic, asked Griffith to head the delegation of Irish plenipotentiaries to negotiate with the British government. The delegates set up Headquarters in Hans Place, London. After nearly two months of negotiations, on 5 December, the delegates decided in private conversation in their headquarters to sign the Treaty and recommended it to the Dáil; negotiations closed at 2.20 a.m. on 6 December 1921. Griffith was the member of the treaty delegation most supportive of its eventual outcome, a compromise based on dominion status, rather than a republic. The Treaty was ratified by the Dáil by 64 votes to 57 on 7 January 1922. On 9 January, de Valera stood down as president and sought re-election by the Dáil, which he lost by a vote of 60 to 58. Griffith then succeeded de Valera as President of Dáil Éireann. A second ratification of the Treaty by the House of Commons of Southern Ireland followed shortly afterwards. Griffith was, however, to a great extent merely a figurehead as President of the Second Dáil.

Suffering from overwork and strain after the long and difficult negotiations with the British government (Griffith attended 41 of the 42 provisional government meetings held between 23 June and 30 July), and the work involved in establishing the Free State government, he entered St. Vincent's Nursing Home, Leeson Street, Dublin, during the first week of August 1922, following an acute attack of tonsillitis. He was confined to a room in St Vincent's by his doctors, who had observed signs of what they thought might be a subarachnoid hemorrhage, but it was difficult to keep him quiet, and he resumed his daily work in the government building. He had been about to leave for his office shortly before 10 a.m. on 12 August 1922, when he paused to retie his shoelace and fell down unconscious. He regained consciousness, but collapsed again with blood coming from his mouth. Three doctors rendered assistance, but to no avail. Fr John Lee of the Marist Fathers administered extreme unction, and Griffith expired as the priest recited the concluding prayer. The cause of death, cerebral haemorrhage, was also reported as being due to heart failure. He died at the age of 51, ten days before Michael Collins' death in an ambush in County Cork. He was buried in Glasnevin Cemetery four days later.

Posthumous commemoration
The historian Diarmaid Ferriter considers that, though he had founded Sinn Féin, Griffith was 'quickly airbrushed' from Irish history. His widow had to beg his former colleagues for a pension, saying that he 'had made them all'. She considered that his grave plot was too modest and threatened to exhume his body. Only in 1968 was a plaque fixed on his former Clontarf home on St Lawrence Road.

Griffith Barracks which is now Griffith College Dublin on South Circular Road, Dublin, Griffith Avenue in North Dublin, Griffith Park in Drumcondra and Arthur Griffith Park in Lucan, County Dublin are named after him. An obelisk erected in 1950 in the grounds of Leinster House commemorates Griffith, as well as Michael Collins and Kevin O'Higgins.

Claims of antisemitism
As editor of the United Irishman, Griffith took an Anti-Dreyfusard line, writing in 1899 to defend the conviction of "the Jew traitor" Dreyfus; accusing the Dublin press of being "almost all Jew rags"; and decrying "Fifty other rags like those which have nothing behind them but the forty or fifty thousand Jewish usurers and pick- pockets in each country and which no decent Christian ever reads except holding his nose as a precaution against nausea". Other editorials in Griffith's United Irishman that year expressed concern about a conspiracy where "the Jew capitalist has got a grip on the lying "Press of Civilization" from Vienna to New York and further", and concluded "we know that all Jews are pretty sure to be traitors if they get the chance." In late 1899 The United Irishman published an article by Griffith that stated: "I have in former years often declared that the Three Evil Influences of the century were the Pirate, the Freemason, and the Jew." The powerful antisemitism found in the pages of the United Irishman during Griffth's editorial tenure has been credited with shaping various aspects of Joyce's Ulysses, especially in the "Cyclops" episode.

In 1904, a piece in the paper voiced support for the Limerick Boycott, a boycott of Jewish businesses in Limerick organised by a local priest, declaring that "the Jew in Limerick has not been boycotted because he is a Jew, but because he is a usurer" and that "If Jews —as Jews— were boycotted, it would be outrageously unjust". Griffith was apparently unaware that the Jews of Limerick had little or no involvement in money-lending or similar practices. The United Irishman also published articles by Oliver St. John Gogarty that contained antisemitic sentiments, which were common in the Ireland of the time. 

During this time an article in the United Irishman also expressed positive views towards Zionism; while "The Jews of Great Britain and Ireland have united, as is their wont, to crush the Christian who dares to block their path or to point them out for what they are — nine tenths of them— usurers and parasites of industry" and excluded from this criticism was "the Zionist minority of the Jews, who include those honest and patriotic Jews who desire the reestablishment of the Hebrew nation in Palestine".

From 1904 until his death, Griffith wrote virtually nothing which could be construed as antisemitic. Historian Colum Kenny writes that Griffith's "thinking developed" which is shown by a "radical shift" in his journalism. Already in 1903, he had supported the candidature of the Jewish Albert Altman for election to Dublin Corporation. In 1909, he wrote a favourable article in Sinn Féin on the Jewish contribution to European civilisation, and in Nationality in 1915, he railed against the Irish Parliamentary Party for saying that Jews should be barred from public office. Griffith's publication 'Scissors and Paste' published three separate articles sympathetic to Jewish victims of Eastern European pogroms and in 1915 his 'Nationality' published a piece which defended English Jew Matthew Nathan - "We do not know of one Nationalist Irishman who objects to Sir Matthew Nathan because of the religion he professes, or who holds the creed that an Irish Jew should be ineligible for any office he was competent to fill in an Irish government".

Griffith was a close friend of Jewish solicitor Michael Noyk, who defended many IRA members in courts martial during the Irish War of Independence, and served as an official in the First Dáil Department of Finance and as a Dáil Court judge during the war. Other Jewish Friends included Dr Edward Lipman, Jacob Elyan and Dr Bethel Solomons. Noyk and Solomons were among a group of friends who purchased a house for Griffith when he married.

References

Further reading
 Patrick Maume, The Long Gestation (Gill & Macmillan, 1999).
 There is a 2003 reprint of The Resurrection of Hungary with an introduction by Patrick Murray (University College Dublin Press).
 The Treaty Debates on-line (Dec 1921 – Jan 1922)
 Anthony J. Jordan, Arthur Griffith with James Joyce & WB Yeats – "Liberating Ireland" [Westport Books 2013]

External links

 Arthur Griffith, Michael Collins (dual memorial volume) available from the Digital Library@Villanova University
 

1871 births
1922 deaths
Burials at Glasnevin Cemetery
Early Sinn Féin TDs
Heads of Irish provisional governments
Irish people of Welsh descent
Leaders of Sinn Féin
Members of the 1st Dáil
Members of the 2nd Dáil
Members of the 3rd Dáil
Members of the House of Commons of Northern Ireland 1921–1925
Members of the House of Commons of Northern Ireland for Fermanagh and Tyrone
Members of the Irish Republican Brotherhood
Members of the Parliament of the United Kingdom for County Cavan constituencies (1801–1922)
Members of the Parliament of the United Kingdom for County Tyrone constituencies (1801–1922)
Ministers for Foreign Affairs (Ireland)
Ministers for Justice (Ireland)
Politicians from Dublin (city)
People of the Irish Civil War (Pro-Treaty side)
People of the Irish War of Independence
Irish political party founders
UK MPs 1910–1918
UK MPs 1918–1922
Antidreyfusards